Ali Gholami (born 5 September 1995) is an Iranian footballer who played as a centre-back for Sepahan in the Iran Pro League.

His younger brother Aref Gholami is also a footballer.

Club career statistics 

Last Update:17 May 2016

References

Sepahan S.C. footballers
1995 births
Living people
People from Gorgan
Association football defenders
Iranian footballers